The Los Angeles Heroes were an American soccer club who played in the United Soccer Leagues from 1993 to 2002. They began life as the San Fernando Valley Golden Eagles upon joining the league, became the San Fernando Valley Heroes when they were relegated to the Premier Development League in 1999 and were renamed the Los Angeles Heroes for their final season in 2002.

Year-by-year

References

H
San Fernando Valley
Defunct Premier Development League teams
Association football clubs established in 1993
Association football clubs disestablished in 2002
Defunct soccer clubs in California
1993 establishments in California
2002 disestablishments in California